Steiny Hill is a mountain located in the Catskill Mountains of New York southwest of West Shokan. Little Rocky is located north, and Flat Hill is located west of Steiny Hill.

References

Mountains of Ulster County, New York
Mountains of New York (state)